The Billboard Hot 100 is a chart that ranks the best-performing singles of the United States. Its data, published by Billboard magazine and compiled by Nielsen SoundScan, is based collectively on each single's weekly physical and digital sales, as well as airplay and streaming.

During 2014, nine singles reached number one on the Hot 100; a tenth single, "The Monster" by Eminem featuring Rihanna, began its run at number one in December 2013. Of those ten number-one singles, four were collaborations. In total, thirteen acts topped the chart as either lead or featured artists, with six—Juicy J, John Legend, Iggy Azalea, Charli XCX, Magic! and Meghan Trainor—achieving their first Hot 100 number-one single. Pharrell Williams' "Happy" was the longest-running number-one of the year, leading the chart for ten weeks; it subsequently topped the Billboard Year-End Hot 100.

In May, Legend's "All of Me" reached number one in its thirtieth week on the Hot 100, earning the distinction of the third-longest ascent to number one after Los del Río's "Macarena" and Lonestar's "Amazed". The song also became the third number-one to feature only piano and vocals, following Adele's "Someone like You" and Bruno Mars' "When I Was Your Man". Azalea became the fourth solo female rapper to top the chart when "Fancy" reached number one in June, a feat previously achieved only by Lauryn Hill, Lil' Kim and Shawnna. In its sixth of seven weeks on top, "Fancy" became the longest-reigning single by a female rapper on the chart.

Taylor Swift's "Blank Space" reached number one in November, ending the run of Swift's own "Shake It Off". In doing so, Swift became the first female artist in the history of the Hot 100, and tenth act overall, to replace herself at the top of the chart. With "Shake It Off" and "Blank Space", Swift was also the only artist to notch multiple number-ones in 2014.

2014 was also the first year in 18 years to have all of its number-one singles that topped the chart that year enter the decade-end top 100 in the 2010s, after all of the number-one songs from 1996 made the decade-end top 100 of the 1990s. (The Monster did not make the decade-end top 100, but started its peak position in 2013.)

Chart history

Number-one artists

See also
2014 in American music
List of Billboard 200 number-one albums of 2014
List of Billboard Hot 100 top 10 singles in 2014

References

External links

United States Hot 100
2014
Hot 100 number-one singles